Myryla (Mırıla) is a rural locality (a selo) the administrative center, and one of two inhabited localities including Khakhyyakh of Solovyevsky Rural Okrug in Churapchinsky District of the Sakha Republic, Russia, located  from Churapcha, the administrative center of the district. Its population as of the 2010 Census was 507; up from 570 recorded in the 2002 Census.

Geography 
The village is located south-east of the center of the Churapchinsky ulus, which is 85 kilometers from Churapchi.

Population 

 Gender composition

According to the 2010 All-Russian Population Census, out of the population of 507 people there are 260 men and 247 women (51.3% and 48.7%, respectively).

 National composition

According to the 2002 census, in the national structure of the population, the Yakuts accounted for 100% of the total population of 570 people.

References

Notes

Sources
Official website of the Sakha Republic. Registry of the Administrative-Territorial Divisions of the Sakha Republic. Churapchinsky District. 

Rural localities in Churapchinsky District